Palmeria scandens, commonly known as the anchor vine or pomegranate vine, is a climbing plant in the family Monimiaceae prevalent in rainforests of Queensland and New South Wales. It may also be present in  New Guinea.

Description
Palmeria scandens is an evergreen woody vine with stems up to  diameter. It is variable in its morphology and has several forms that are not considered to be distinct enough to warrant placing them into separate taxa. 

The female receptacle is initially about  diameter, enlarging after fertilisation to a somewhat fleshy false fruit containing up to 9 drupes. At maturity the swollen receptacle is about  diameter and splits to reveal the contents. It is green outside, pink and hairy inside, with the red drupes (each containing a single seed) attached to the inner surface.

Taxonomy
This species was first described in 1864 by Ferdinand von Mueller, who based his description on material collected by John Dallachy at Rockingham Bay. His description was published in his tome Fragmenta phytographiæ Australiæ.

Etymology
The genus name was given by Mueller to honour the English-born Australian medical practitioner and politician James Frederick Palmer. The species epithet scandens is from Latin and means "climbing".

Distribution
There is also a single recorded occurrence of this species in New Guinea.

Conservation
This species is listed by the Queensland Department of Environment and Science as least concern. , it has not been assessed by the IUCN.

Gallery

References 

Nature Conservation Act least concern biota
Monimiaceae
Laurales of Australia
Flora of New South Wales
Flora of Queensland
Endemic flora of Australia
Plants described in 1864
Taxa named by Ferdinand von Mueller